Farewell to Cinderella is a 1937 British romance film directed by Maclean Rogers and starring Anne Pichon, John Robinson and Glennis Lorimer. The film was made at the Nettlefold Studios in Walton-on-Thames as a quota quickie for release by the Hollywood firm RKO.

Cast
 Anne Pichon  as Margaret 
 John Robinson as Stephen Moreley 
 Glennis Lorimer as Betty Temperley
 Sebastian Smith as Andy Weir 
 Arthur Rees as Uncle William 
 Ivor Barnard as Mr. Temperley 
 Margaret Damer as Mrs. Temperley 
 Ena Grossmith as Emily

References

Bibliography
 Chibnall, Steve. Quota Quickies: The British of the British 'B' Film. British Film Institute, 2007.
 Low, Rachael. Filmmaking in 1930s Britain. George Allen & Unwin, 1985.
 Wood, Linda. British Films, 1927-1939. British Film Institute, 1986.

External links

1937 films
British romance films
British black-and-white films
1930s romance films
Films directed by Maclean Rogers
Films shot at Nettlefold Studios
1930s English-language films
1930s British films